USS Goodwill was a United States Navy patrol vessel in commission from 1917 or 1918 until the end of 1918.

Goodwill was built as a civilian motorboat of the same name in 1917. In 1917 or 1918, the U.S. Navy acquired her from her owner, the Panama Canal Company, for use as a section patrol boat during World War I. She never received a section patrol (SP) number, but she was commissioned as USS Goodwill.

Assigned to the 15th Naval District, Goodwill conducted shore and harbor patrols in the Panama Canal Zone for the rest of World War I. She was returned to the Panama Canal Company on 31 December 1918.

References
 
 Goodwill at Department of the Navy Naval History and Heritage Command Online Library of Selected Images: U.S. Navy Ships -- Listed by Hull Number "SP" #s and "ID" #s -- World War I Era Vessels without Numbers (listed alphabetically by name)

Patrol vessels of the United States Navy
World War I patrol vessels of the United States
1917 ships